Springboard Software, inc. was a software company founded in 1982 known primarily for its line of non-curriculum based educational software. It was bought by Spinnaker Software in 1990.

Titles 
 Early Games for Young Children (1982: Atari 8-bit, 1983: Apple II, Commodore 64, TRS-80, CoCo, 1984: MS-DOS, 1986: Macintosh)
 Fraction Factory (1984: Apple II, Commodore 64, MS-DOS)
 Easy as ABC (1984: Apple II, Commodore 64, MS-DOS, Macintosh)
 Quizagon (1984: Commodore 64)
 Stickers (Apple II, Commodore 64, MS-DOS)
 Puzzle Master (Apple II)
 Rainbow Painter (Apple II, Commodore 64)
 Mask Parade (Apple II, MS-DOS)
 Piece of Cake Math (1983: Apple II, Atari 8-bit, Commodore 64, MS-DOS)
 Graphics Expander vol. 1 (Apple II, Commodore 64, MS-DOS)
 Certificate maker (1986)
 Certificate Library vol. 1
 Certificate Expander vol. 1
 The Newsroom (1984: Apple II, MS-DOS, 1985: Commodore 64, 1987: Atari 8-bit)
 The Newsroom Pro (1988)
 Clip Art Collection vol. 1
 Clip Art Collection vol. 2
 Clip Art Collection vol. 3
 Springboard Publisher (1987: Apple II, MS-DOS, 1989: Macintosh)
 Springboard Publisher Style Sheets - Newsletters
 Springboard Publisher Laser Driver
 Springboard Publisher Fonts
 Works of Art Assortment Series
 Works of Art Education Series
 Works of Art Holiday Series
 Top Honors (Macintosh)
 Works of Art Laser Fonts vol. 1 (Macintosh)
 Works of Art Laser Art Business Selection vol. 1 (Macintosh)
 Works of Art Samplers (Apple II, MS-DOS, Macintosh)
 Art a la Mac (Macintosh)
 Family Matters (Apple II, MS-DOS, Macintosh)
 Atlas Explorer (Apple II, MS-DOS, Macintosh)
 Hidden Agenda (1988: MS-DOS, Macintosh)

References 

Defunct educational software companies
Defunct software companies of the United States
Software companies based in Minnesota
Defunct video game companies of the United States
Software companies established in 1982
Software companies disestablished in 1990
1982 establishments in Minnesota
1990 disestablishments in Minnesota